{{Infobox roller coaster
| name                 = Nemesis Inferno
| logo                 = Nemesis Inferno Logo.jpg
| logodimensions       = 250px
| image                = Nemesis Inferno.jpg
| imagedimensions      = 250px
| caption              = One of Nemesis Infernos trains navigating the vertical loop.
| previousnames        =
| location             = Thorpe Park
| locationarticle      = 
| section              = The Jungle 
| subsection           = 
| coordinates          = 
| status               = Operating
| opened               = 
| soft_opened          =
| year                 = 2003
| closed               =
| cost                 = £8 million
| previousattraction   = Mr. Rabbit's Tropical Travels
| replacement          =
| type                 = Steel
| type2                = Inverted
| type3                = 
| manufacturer         = Bolliger & Mabillard
| designer             = John Wardley & Werner Stengel & Jordan Forster
| model                = Inverted Coaster – Custom
| track                =
| lift                 = Chain lift hill
| height_m             = 29
| drop_m               = 28
| length_m             = 750
| speed_mph            = 50
| inversions           = 4
| duration             = 1:43
| angle                = 
| capacity             = 1,150
| acceleration         = 
| acceleration_from    = 
| acceleration_mph     = 
| acceleration_km/h    = 
| acceleration_in      = 
| gforce               = 5
| restriction_cm       = 140
| trains               = 2
| carspertrain         = 7
| rowspercar           = 1
| ridersperrow         = 4
| virtual_queue_name  = Fastrack
| virtual_queue_image = Merlin Entertainment Fastrack availability.svg
| virtual_queue_status= available
| single_rider         = 
| accessible           = 
| transfer_accessible  = 
| custom_label_1       =
| custom_value_1       =
| custom_label_2       =
| custom_value_2       =
| custom_label_3       =
| custom_value_3       =
| custom_label_4       =
| custom_value_4       =
| rcdb_number          = 1747
}}Nemesis Inferno is a steel inverted roller coaster at the Thorpe Park theme park in Surrey, England, UK. Its layout was conceived and designed by John Wardley and then built by Bolliger & Mabillard with Werner Stengel providing the layout calculations, the same Swiss firm that built the related Nemesis inverted roller coaster at Alton Towers. As a result, Nemesis and Nemesis Inferno are often compared. It is also listed on the Alton Towers website that the ride is “Nemesis’ Sister”.

The  Nemesis Inferno is themed around an erupting tropical volcano.

History
In 2002, after the opening of Colossus, Thorpe Park officially announced the addition of Nemesis Inferno in 2003. Construction took place throughout 2002 with the first test run being completed in December 2002. Nemesis Inferno officially opened to the public on 5 April 2003. According to Nikki Nolan of The Tussauds Group who operated the park at the time, the ride was installed just one year after Colossus to "help transform Thorpe Park into a real thrill park".

In 2004, Thorpe Park approached Guinness World Records to set the record for the "Most Naked People on a Rollercoaster". In May 2004, 81 students took part in the record, which was set at 28 – the number of seats on a single Nemesis Inferno train. In August 2004, Nemesis at Alton Towers broke the record with 32 riders.

The roller coaster was prominently featured in an episode of The Inbetweeners.

Characteristics
Riders of Nemesis Inferno experience up to 5 times the force of gravity on the near-two-minute ride. The ride is reported to have cost £8 million.Nemesis Inferno operates with two steel and fiberglass trains, each containing seven cars. Each car seats four riders in a single row for a total of 28 riders per train. Two seats on Nemesis Inferno have been modified to cater for larger riders.

The ride is themed around an erupting volcano. The name of the ride suggests that it is related to the original Nemesis, an inverted coaster installed at Alton Towers in 1994.

Ride experience

After leaving the station, the train takes a right-hand swing drop into a tunnel, where it is shot with simulated fire. It makes a brief left turn before entering the  lift hill. At the top, it takes a long left-swing drop into its first inversion, a vertical loop right, then rises straight into the second inversion, a zero-G-roll. The ride then turns to the right and enters the first of the interlocking corkscrews, then enters a right-handed, over-banked turn before continuing through the second of the interlocking corkscrews. After a large right turn, followed by a sharp upwards left turn, the train enters the brake run. Following a small right turn, it continues to the station.

Reception
In Mitch Hawker's worldwide Best Roller Coaster Poll, Nemesis Inferno entered at position 70 in 2003, before peaking at 51 in 2006. The ride's ranking in subsequent polls is shown in the table below.Nemesis Inferno is commonly compared with its Alton Towers counterpart, Nemesis, with many citing the latter as the superior ride. Nemesis has ranked favourably in Amusement Todays annual Golden Ticket Awards, being one of only seven roller coasters to appear in the top 50 steel roller coasters for all 15 years. Nemesis Inferno, on the other hand, has never made an appearance. In Mitch Hawker's worldwide Best Roller Coaster Poll Nemesis Inferno has an average ranking of 80, while Nemesis average ranking is 6. In a poll conducted by the Los Angeles Times, Nemesis received 37.93% of the vote for title of best roller coaster in England, while Nemesis Inferno received 0.32%. Jeremy Thompson of Roller Coaster Philosophy describes Nemesis as "a vastly superior ride" to Nemesis Inferno. Thompson describes Nemesis Inferno as "something a bit better" than his expectations; however, he was "not sure if it was a particularly good ride or not".

Notes

References

External links
 
 

Inverted roller coasters
Roller coasters in the United Kingdom
Roller coasters introduced in 2003
Roller coasters manufactured by Bolliger & Mabillard
Roller coasters operated by Merlin Entertainments
Steel roller coasters
Thorpe Park roller coasters
Inverted roller coasters manufactured by Bolliger & Mabillard